Qale Zobayd village is the center of Charsadda District, Ghor province, Afghanistan.

Climate
Qale-Zobayd features a warm-summer humid continental climate (Dsb) in the Köppen climate classification.

References

See also
Ghōr Province

Populated places in Ghor Province